This is a list of beaches in the Greater Manila Area.

Manila, the capital city of the Philippines, is located on an isthmus between Manila Bay, which opens to the South China Sea to the west, and Laguna de Bay to the east. It shares a long coastline with surrounding provinces dotted with many coves and beaches. Manila Bay was also once ringed with sandy beaches, notably the area of Pineda (Pasay), Tambo  (Parañaque) and San Roque (now Cavite City). However, increased urbanization and unchecked industrialization in the last century has led to serious water quality degradation making the whole area unsafe for swimming. Land reclamation has also permanently closed these once natural beaches.

Today, most of the beaches in this region are found in the surrounding provinces in the Greater Manila Area within a 100-mile radius from the capital city. The most prominent beaches are found in Batangas in the south, and Bataan and Zambales in the north particularly those of Nasugbu, San Juan, Calatagan, Subic, San Antonio, Morong, Mariveles and Bagac. Artificial beaches have also been created along the shores of Manila Bay, known simply as the Manila Bay Beach, and at the Paris Beach Club of Azure Urban Resort Residences in Parañaque.

North mainland

 Agwawan Beach, Mariveles
 Anvaya Cove, Morong
 Barretto Beach, Subic
 Boardwalk Beach, Olongapo
 Camaya Coast (Wain Beach), Mariveles
 Camayan Beach, Morong
 Costa Vida Privada, Bagac
 Lusong Beach, Mariveles
 Mawakis Cove, Mariveles
 Montemar Beach, Bagac
 Nagbalayong Beach, Morong
 Playa La Caleta, Bagac
 Pundaquit Beach, San Antonio
 Quinawan Bay, Bagac
 Redondo Peninsula, San Antonio
 Sabang Beach, Morong
 Saysain Beach, Bagac
 West Nuk Cove, Morong
 Talaga Beach, Mariveles

South mainland

 Anilao Beach, Mabini
 Balibago Beach, Calatagan
 Calayo Beach, Nasugbu
 Calumpang Beach, Ternate
 Caylabne Cove, Ternate
 Gerthel Beach, Lobo
 Hamilo Coast, Nasugbu
 Hugon Beach, San Juan
 Laiya Beach, San Juan
 Lido Beach Resort, Noveleta
 Limbones Cove, Maragondon
 Mahabang Buhangin Beach, San Juan
 Malabrigo Beach, Lobo
 Matabungkay Beach, Lian
 Munting Buhangin Beach, Nasugbu
 Natipunan Beach, Nasugbu
 Pico de Loro Cove, Nasugbu
 Puerto Azul, Ternate
 Punta Fuego, Nasugbu
 Santa Ana Beach, Calatagan
 Santa Mercedes Beach, Maragondon
 Tali Beach, Nasugbu
 TIP Beach Resort and New Noveleta Cockpit Arena, Noveleta
 Villamar Beach Resorts I and II, Noveleta

See also
 List of islands in the Greater Manila Area
 List of beaches in the Philippines

References

Beaches
Beaches
Beaches
Becahes